Temple Beth-El  is an historic Moorish Revival synagogue located at 208 South 15th Street in Corsicana, Navarro County, Texas.

Landmark status
Temple Beth-El became a Recorded Texas Historic Landmark in 1981. On February 3, 1987, Temple Beth-El was added to the National Register of Historic Places. Temple Beth-El is one of two State Antiquities Landmarks in Navarro County.

History
The Jewish community of Corsicana established a congregation in 1871. The congregation worshiped at each other's homes until it could raise the funding to build a synagogue.

Julius Magil served as rabbi in the early days of its new building. He was born December 29, 1870, at Mitau, Courland, which was then in the Russian Empire but is now part of Latvia. He received a secular education at Realgymnasium and University of Zürich, Switzerland. Rabbi Magil's religious training took place at the Talmudical College of Grobin, Courland. Rabbi Magil then studied medicine at Fort Wayne Medical College, and he received a Ph.D. from Rogers College in 1898.

The synagogue was built by a Reform Jewish congregation in 1898.  It is a wood-frame building, with clapboard siding, keyhole windows in the front doors, and a pair of octagonal towers topped by onion domes. In 1900, 66% of the congregants were immigrants and over half were from Poland, Russia, or Hungary. 19% of the membership was from Germany and another 19% was from France. While Eastern European Jews tended towards Orthodox Judaism and German Jews tended towards Reform Judaism, Temple Beth-El was notable as a Reform synagogue with a predominantly Eastern European and heavily Polish membership.

Rabbi Ernest Joseph served as the spiritual leader of Temple Beth-El from 1968 to 1980.

In 1980, Temple Beth-El closed as a congregation, although a local rabbi still leads a Jewish service on a monthly basis. The property was donated to the City of Corsicana around 1990. The City uses it as a community center.

In 2010, the synagogue's stained glass windows were renovated. The synagogue's facade and domes were restored in 2013.

See also

National Register of Historic Places listings in Navarro County, Texas
Recorded Texas Historic Landmarks in Navarro County

References

External links

Davis, Robert P. "Beth El, Corsicana, TX". August 25, 1996.

1898 establishments in Texas
Ashkenazi Jewish culture in Texas
Buildings and structures in Navarro County, Texas
Former synagogues in Texas
Hungarian-Jewish culture in the United States
Moorish Revival architecture in Texas
Moorish Revival synagogues
National Register of Historic Places in Navarro County, Texas
Polish-American culture in Texas
Polish-Jewish culture in the United States
Religious organizations established in 1871
Reform synagogues in Texas
Russian-Jewish culture in the United States
Synagogues completed in 1898
Synagogues on the National Register of Historic Places in Texas